"Angel Eyes" is a song written by John Hiatt and Fred Koller, and produced by Greg Ladanyi for the Jeff Healey Band's first album See the Light (1988). It was first released in the United Kingdom as the album's second single in April 1989 and was issued in the United States several weeks later. In 2004, "Angel Eyes" was covered by Australian Idol series one contestant Paulini and became her first  single in Australia.

Chart performance
In Canada, the song was on the charts for 28 weeks. It was the 70th highest selling single in the United States for 1989. Hiatt's own version of the song finally appeared on his 1994 live album Hiatt Comes Alive at Budokan?. A studio version of the song was included on the 1998 album The Best of John Hiatt.

Track listing
Vinyl single
 "Angel Eyes" — 4:32
 "Don't Let Your Chance Go By" — 3:20

Charts

Weekly charts

Year-end charts

Paulini version

"Angel Eyes" was covered by Australian recording artist Paulini for her debut studio album, One Determined Heart (2004). It was produced by Audius Mtawarira and released physically on July 5, 2004, as the lead single from the album. In a statement posted to her official website, Paulini said "'Angel Eyes' is an amazing song. Audius came up with some great ideas and we did it and it worked. All the instruments are live. It's turned out to be one of the best song[s]." "Angel Eyes" peaked at number one on the ARIA Singles Chart for three consecutive weeks and was certified platinum by the Australian Recording Industry Association (ARIA), for shipments of 70,000 copies. The song earned Paulini an ARIA No. 1 Chart Award and a nomination for "Highest Selling Single" at the 2004 ARIA Music Awards.

Chart performance
"Angel Eyes" debuted at number two on the ARIA Singles Chart on July 12, 2004. The following week, the song rose to number one, where it remained for three consecutive weeks. "Angel Eyes" was certified platinum by the ARIA, for shipments of 70,000 copies. On the New Zealand Singles Chart, the song debuted and peaked at number 34 on October 11, 2004.

Music video
The accompanying music video for "Angel Eyes" was filmed on June 15, 2004, in Sydney. On June 1, 2004, Sony BMG announced that they were looking for fans to appear in the video. The video begins with Paulini walking down a footpath and then onto a stage. It shows Paulini walking around behind the stage before proceeding out and singing to an audience of clapping fans.

Track listing
 CD single
 "Angel Eyes" – 4:01
 "Angel Eyes" (Buchman Bounce) – 4:02
 "Angel Eyes" (Rick Will Album Mix) – 4:48

Charts

Weekly charts

Year-end charts

Certification

New Grass Revival version
The progressive bluegrass band New Grass Revival recorded a cover which can be found on their last album release, Friday Night in America from 1989. It's been featured as well on the bands compilation albums, 1990's New Grass Anthology, 1994's The Best of New Grass Revival, and 2005's Grass Roots: The Best of New Grass Revival.

See also
 List of one-hit wonders in the United States

References

1988 songs
1989 singles
2004 debut singles
Number-one singles in Australia
Paulini songs
Pop ballads
Rock ballads
Songs written by John Hiatt
Songs written by Fred Koller
Arista Records singles
Sony Music Australia singles
Song recordings produced by Audius Mtawarira